Psychrobacter salsus is a Gram-negative, strictly aerobic bacterium of the genus Psychrobacter, which was isolated from the fast ice in the middle of Geologie Archipelago in Adelie Land in Antarctica.

References

External links
Type strain of Psychrobacter salsus at BacDive -  the Bacterial Diversity Metadatabase

Moraxellaceae
Bacteria described in 2005